Unclaimed Goods is a 1918 American silent Western comedy film directed by Rollin S. Sturgeon and written by Gardner Hunting and Johnston McCulley. The film stars Vivian Martin, Harrison Ford, Casson Ferguson, George A. McDaniel, Dick La Reno, and George Kunkel. The film was released on April 14, 1918, by Paramount Pictures. It is not known whether the film currently survives.

Plot
A Wells Fargo & Co. express agent has to determine what to do with an unusual shipment (Vivian Martin) that has arrived at his office.  The girl's father is being held prisoner by the villain, who is making a claim for the girl. The agent saves the day and claims the "goods" for himself.

Cast 
 Vivian Martin as Betsey Burke
 Harrison Ford as Danny Donegan
 Casson Ferguson as Cocopah Kid
 George A. McDaniel as 'Gentleman Joe' Slade (credited as George McDaniel)
 Dick La Reno as Sheriff Bill Burke
 George Kunkel as Uncle "Place Jim" Murphy
 Carmen Phillips as Idaho Ina
 Anne Schaefer as Mrs. Ryal (credited as Ann Schaefer)

Reception
Like many American films of the time, Unclaimed Goods was subject to cuts by city and state film censorship boards. For example, the Chicago Board of Censors conducted two reviews and required cuts, in Reel 1, of the first train scene showing the "Cocopah Kid" robbing the express messenger with gun, Reel 2, two scenes in saloon showing young woman plying Cocopah Kid with drink, the intertitle "Go on back — you got him hooked", two scenes of Slade in saloon threatening Burke with gun, first long and three gambling scenes to include cheating, Slade shooting Cocopah Kid, two scenes of Slade and gang forcing Murphy towards saloon at point of gun, Slade's men searching man's pocket for gun, three scenes of young women at bar in saloon, scene of young woman in foreground with slit skirt, Reel 4, the intertitle "So the auction thing goes and the maverick will belong to me", flash scene of young woman in low cut gown standing near men, Cocopah Kid threatening and shooting messenger, express agent slugging guard, Reel 5, five saloon scenes with women at bar, woman in background drinking, saloon scene of Slade holding up Cocopah Kid and shooting him, Slade falling outside saloon door after being shot, entire scene of Burke on road shooting guard and guard falling, and three scenes of gang shooting at Burke.

References

External links

 
 
 The AFI Catalog of Feature Films: Unclaimed Goods

1918 films
1918 comedy films
1910s English-language films
1910s Western (genre) comedy films
American black-and-white films
Films directed by Rollin S. Sturgeon
Paramount Pictures films
Silent American Western (genre) comedy films
1910s American films